The Syrian Olympic Committee is the National Olympic Committee in Syria for the Olympic Games movement. It is a non-profit organization led by the Syrian Arab Republic that selects players and teams to represent the nation, and raises funds to send to Olympic events organized by the International Olympic Committee (IOC).

History
The Syrian Olympic Committee was established in 1948 and in the same year he was admitted to International Olympic Committee. 

Mowaffak Joumaa served as President of the Syrian Olympic Committee and the General Sports Federation from 2010 to 2020, then he became an honorary president, and was succeeded by Feras Mouala who served as Secretary General from 2010 to 2019.

A parallel unrecognized committee, named the Syrian National Olympic Committee, was created in 2016 during the Syrian civil war by the Syrian opposition claiming the legitimacy of Syria's representation at the Olympics.

List of presidents 
The following is a list of presidents of the Syrian Olympic Committee and the General Sports Federation since 1995.

See also
Syria at the Olympics

References

External links
Official website

National Olympic Committees
Syria at the Olympics
Oly
1948 establishments in Syria